Omar Haktab Traoré (born 4 February 1998) is a German professional footballer who plays as a defender for VfL Osnabrück in the .

Career
Traoré signed for KFC Uerdingen 05 on a three-year contract in summer 2020.

He signed for VfL Osnabrück on a two-year contract in summer 2021.

Personal life
Born in Germany, Traoré is of Togolese descent. He is the older brother of fellow VfL Osnabrück player Hakim Traoré.

References

External links
 
 

1998 births
Living people
German people of Togolese descent
German footballers
Sportspeople from Osnabrück
Footballers from Lower Saxony
Association football defenders
SV Rödinghausen players
KFC Uerdingen 05 players
VfL Osnabrück players
Regionalliga players
3. Liga players